Coupar Angus (Gaelic: Cùbar Aonghais) is a town in Perth and Kinross, Scotland,  south of Blairgowrie.

The name Coupar Angus serves to differentiate the town from Cupar, Fife.  The town was traditionally on the border between Angus and Perthshire, the town centre being in Perthshire. The Angus part was transferred to Perthshire in 1891, but the town retained its name.

It is located on the A94 Perth-Forfar road, although the town centre itself is now bypassed. Coupar Angus railway station previously served the town.

History

The six-storey Tolbooth was built in 1762, funded by public subscription.

In the Middle Ages the Cistercian Coupar Angus Abbey was one of Scotland's most important monasteries, founded by Malcolm IV (1153–65) in the 1160s.  Of the abbey, only architectural fragments, preserved in the 19th-century parish church (which is probably on the site of the monastic church), or built into houses and walls throughout the town, survive, along with part of one of its gatehouses.

Coupar Angus Town Hall was commissioned to celebrate the Golden Jubilee of Queen Victoria and completed in 1887.

Several Polish units were stationed in and around Coupar Angus during the Second World War.

The Scottish Fold breed of cat originated in or near Coupar Angus.

Sport
Coupar Angus is home to the junior football club Coupar Angus F.C. and also Coupar Angus Amateur Football Club.

Notable people
William Nairne Clark (1804–1854), born locally and one of the two protagonists that fought the first recorded duel in Western Australia.
Alan Gilzean (1938-2018), locally-born former professional footballer from the 1960s and 1970s.
James Stirton (1833-1917), locally-born physician and leading expert on mosses and lichen.
Jock Sutherland (1889-1948), locally-born coach for the Pittsburgh Steelers 1946–1947.
Major-General Douglas Wimberley (1896-1983), commander of the 51st (Highland) Division in the Second World War.

References

 
Scottish Fold